Antichristian Phenomenon is the third EP by Polish extreme metal band Behemoth. The first five tracks were recorded in July and August 2000 at the Hendrix Studios in Poland during the Thelema.6 studio session. "Day of Suffering" was recorded in November 2000, also in the Hendrix Studios. "Carnage" was recorded in April 1999 at the Starcraft Stimulation Studios.

A limited tour edition, which was packed in a black jewel case, was released during the European "Act of Rebellion" tour; 1000 copies exist of this edition. There was also a 7-inch picture disc released, which was limited to 500 copies, containing only three songs.

The EP also contains a multimedia track: a live video of the song "Christians To The Lions", featured on Thelema.6. It was filmed at Proxima Club in Warsaw, Poland, on 15 June 2001.

Track listing

Personnel

Release history

References

2000 EPs
2001 EPs
Behemoth (band) EPs
Avantgarde Music EPs
Albums produced by Adam Darski